The Bomb is a 2015 American documentary film about the history of nuclear weapons, from theoretical scientific considerations at the very beginning, to their first use on August 6, 1945, to their global political implications in the present day. The two-hour PBS film was written and directed by Rushmore DeNooyer, who noted the project took a year and a half to complete, since much of the film footage and images was only recently declassified by the United States Department of Defense. According to DeNooyer, “It wouldn’t take very many bombs to really change life on Earth, ... The idea that there are thousands of them sitting around is pretty scary. I don’t think people today realize that. They don’t think about it. I don’t think they are scared. But in a way, they should be.” Mark Dawidziak, of the Cleveland Plain Dealer, summarized the film as follows: "The Bomb moves swiftly to cover Hiroshima and Nagasaki, the Cold War, the arms race, the Red Scare, the witch hunt, the Cuban Missile Crisis, test-ban treaties, the "Star Wars" initiative, the anti-nuke movement, the collapse of the Soviet Union and the rise of new nuclear threats." According to historian Richard Rhodes, “The invention [of 'The Bomb'] was a millennial change in human history: for the first time, we were now capable of our own destruction, as a species.”

Participants
The documentary film is narrated by Jonathan Adams and includes the following participants (alphabetized by last name):

 Jonathan Adams (narrator)
 John Andersen (former Nuclear Weapons Engineer)
 Hal Behl (aeronautical engineer; Manhattan Project)
 Walter J. Boyne (former U.S. Strategic Air Command pilot)
 Alan Carr (historian; The Forgotten Physicist)
 Lynn Eden (historian; Whole World on Fire)
 John Hopkins (former Director, Nuclear Weapons Program)
 Lilli Hornig (chemist; Manhattan Project)
 Sergei Khrushchev (historian; Khrushchev in Power)
 Amy Knight (historian; How The Cold War Began)
 Charles Loeber (former Nuclear Weapons Engineer)
 Elaine Tyler May (historian; Homeward Bound)
 Glen McDuff (former Nuclear Weapons Engineer)
 Laura McEnaney (historian; Civil Defense Begins at Home)
 Robert Norris (historian; Racing for the Bomb) 
 William Perry (former U.S. Secretary of Defense)
 Roger Rasmussen (retired U.S. Army engineer; Trinity witness)
 Richard Rhodes (historian; The Making of the Atomic Bomb)
 Svetlana Savranskaya (historian; The Soviet Cuban Missile Crisis)
 Martin Sherwin (historian; American Prometheus)
 George Shultz (former U.S. Secretary of State)
 Lester Tenney (American POW)
 Jonathan M. Weisgall (author; Operation Crossroads)

Gallery

Reviews and criticism
Pulitzer prize-winning American conservative journalist and commentator Dorothy Rabinowitz, of the Wall Street Journal, writes, "Documentaries commemorating the atomic bomb’s first use are rarely deficient in drama, and this overstuffed yet altogether gripping work is no exception. Its assortment of uninhibitedly blunt commentators doesn’t hurt either." According to David Hinckley of the Daily News, "...some of the most powerful moments [of the film] focus on people, not technology." Robert Lloyd of the Los Angeles Times noted, "...much of this tale, as accidental as it also feels inevitable, is one of individual egos warping history, of scientists at war with politicians, of evil scientists at war with good ones, of wounded bureaucrats out for revenge." Verne Gay of Newsday concludes, "The Bomb is a decent overview but with insufficient analysis or perspective ..." Mark Dawidziak, of the Cleveland Plain Dealer, reports, "[The film is] part history lesson, part science class, part sociological study, part political thriller and part cautionary tale ... " Neil Genzlinger of the New York Times observes, "The arms race is dutifully chronicled and the anti-nuke movement too, but only in its final minutes does the program get around to noting that nuclear bombs are still with us and that countries other than the United States and Russia have them. There’s a brief suggestion that if India and Pakistan ever go at it the whole world will suffer from collateral damage, but the thought doesn’t linger. It’s as if The Bomb doesn’t want to intrude on the present by reminding us that the genie released 70 years ago [on August 6, 1945] is still at large."

Related films
In the 67th Berlin International Film Festival, the experimental 2016 film the bomb by Kevin Ford, Smriti Keshari and Eric Schlosser was premiered.
It featured archive footage about the atomic bomb along live music by The Acid.

See also 

 History of the anti-nuclear movement
 History of nuclear weapons
 International Atomic Energy Agency
 International Day against Nuclear Tests
 List of nuclear tests
 List of nuclear weapons
 Manhattan Project
 The Mystery of Matter (PBS film)

References

External links
  at the PBS WebSite/1.
  at the PBS WebSite/2.
 .
 
 Peace Museums: Hiroshima; Nagasaki.
 Largest bomb exploded – Tsar Bomba (1961; Soviet Union)
 Federation of American Scientists - Worldwide Nuclear Forces Guide
 Video (14:25) - Time-Lapse Map of All 2053 Nuclear Explosions on Planet Earth (7 Countries, 1945 - 1998).

2015 television films
2015 films
2015 documentary films
Documentary films about nuclear war and weapons
Documentary films about United States history
American documentary television films
Films set in the United States
Films shot in the United States
2010s American films